Beautiful So Far is the second studio album by Norwegian singer-songwriter Bertine Zetlitz and was released on September 4, 2000.

Track listing

Chart positions

References

2000 albums
Bertine Zetlitz albums